Owen is the full-length debut album by the band Owen. It was released on September 18, 2001.

Track listing

Trivia
The Japanese bonus track "Heads Will Ache" is a different recording of the song that would eventually become "Everyone Feels Like You" from the album No Good for No One Now.  This version contains only a portion of the lyrics and the tempo is much slower.
Track 4 – "Accidentally" is a longer instrumental version of track 7 – "Dead Men Don't Lie".

References

2001 debut albums
Polyvinyl Record Co. albums
Owen (musician) albums